is a former Japanese football player.

Playing career
Takizawa was born in Fuchu on April 20, 1978. After graduating from high school, he joined J1 League club Nagoya Grampus Eight in 1997. However he could hardly play in the match until 1999. He played many matches as left midfielder from 2000 and became a regular player in 2003. However his opportunity to play decreased in 2004 and he moved to Vissel Kobe in August. In 2005, he moved to JEF United Chiba. However he could hardly play in the match and left the club end of 2005 season. In June 2006, he joined J2 League club Yokohama FC. He played many matches and the club won the champions in 2006 and was promoted to J1. In 2007, although he played as regular player, the club finished at bottom place and was relegated to J2 in a year. In 2009, he moved to Tokyo Verdy. Although he played as regular player, his opportunity to play decreased in late season. In 2010, he moved to Thailand and played for Bangkok Glass, RSU and Ayutthaya. He retired end of 2014 season.

Club statistics

References

External links

1978 births
Living people
Association football people from Tokyo
Japanese footballers
J1 League players
J2 League players
Nagoya Grampus players
Vissel Kobe players
JEF United Chiba players
Yokohama FC players
Tokyo Verdy players
Kunihiko Takizawa
Japanese expatriate footballers
Expatriate footballers in Thailand
Association football midfielders